Petrophile ericifolia is a species of flowering plant in the family Proteaceae and is endemic to southwestern Western Australia. It is a shrub with cylindrical leaves, and oval to spherical heads of hairy, yellow flowers.

Description
The flowers are arranged on the ends of branchlets, in sessile, oval to spherical heads  in diameter, with many egg-shaped, pointed involucral bracts at the base.

Taxonomy
Petrophile ericifolia was first formally described in 1830 by Robert Brown in the Supplementum to his Prodromus Florae Novae Hollandiae et Insulae Van Diemen from material collected by William Baxter near King Georges Sound in 1829. The specific epithet (ericifolia) means "erica-leaved".

In 1995, Donald Bruce Foreman described two subspecies in Flora of Australia and the names are accepted by the Australian Plant Census:
Subspecies subpubescens was first formally described in 1923 by Karel Domin as Petrophile ericifolia f. subpubescens.

Distribution and habitat
Subspecies ericifolia grows in heath and scrub from the Fitzgerald River National Park to the Stirling Range and inland to Wagin. Subspecies subpubescens grows in low shrubland mostly between Northam and Kellerberrin.

Conservation status
Both subspecies of Petrophile ericifolia are classified as "not threatened" by the Western Australian Government Department of Parks and Wildlife.

References

ericifolia
Endemic flora of Western Australia
Eudicots of Western Australia
Plants described in 1830
Taxa named by Robert Brown (botanist, born 1773)